Anna Katarina is a Swiss actress.

Early life and family
Anna Katarina is the daughter of cellists from Bern, Switzerland, where she was born. She is a classically trained pianist.

Career
She came to the US in her twenties whereupon she joined a circus and acting school. She played the lead role of Tamara de Lempicka in the play Tamara, which ran in Los Angeles in the 1980s; prior to her, the role was played by Anjelica Huston.  

Other roles include the Poodle Lady in the feature film Batman Returns and Isabelle Jeunet in six episodes of the HBO series Boardwalk Empire. She has made guest appearances in an episode of both Law & Order and its sister show Law & Order: Criminal Intent. She performed supporting roles in "Haven", an episode of Star Trek: The Next Generation; the TV movie The Death of the Incredible Hulk (1990), and the Pink Panther feature film remake (2006).

Filmography
 Star Trek: The Next Generation (1987, TV series) - Valeda Innis
 Slaves of New York (1989) - Mooshka
 The Blood of Heroes (1989) - Big Cimber
 The Death of the Incredible Hulk (1990, TV movie) - Bella / Ashenko
 Law & Order (1991, TV series) - Elena Skolnick
 Batman Returns (1992) - Poodle Lady
 A Weekend with Barbara und Ingrid (1992) - Barbara
 Omega Doom (1996) - Bartender
 The Game (1997) - Elizabeth
 Law & Order: Criminal Intent (1997, TV series) - Helen Reynolds
 The Pink Panther (2006) - Agent Corbeille
 Zodiac (2007) - Society Woman (uncredited)
 Star Trek (2009) - Vulcan Council Member #2
 Angels & Demons (2009) - Docent
 Boardwalk Empire (2010) - Isabelle Jeunet
 The Dictator (2012) - Angela Merkel

References

External links
 
 

Swiss film actresses
1960 births
Living people
People from Bern
Swiss television actresses
Swiss emigrants to the United States